The year 594 BC was a year of the pre-Julian Roman calendar. In the Roman Empire, it was known as year 160 Ab urbe condita . The denomination 594 BC for this year has been used since the early medieval period, when the Anno Domini calendar era became the prevalent method in Europe for naming years.

Events
 Facing an economic crisis and popular discontent, the leaders of Athens appoint the poet-statesman Solon to implement democratic reforms and revive the city's constitution.
 Solon establishes the Ecclesia, the principal assembly of democracy in Athens during its Golden Age.
 Sappho returns from exile in Sicily.

Births

Deaths

References